Aleksandr Korobov (born 1 April 1978) is a Kazakhstani ski jumper. He competed in the normal hill and large hill events at the 2002 Winter Olympics.

References

1978 births
Living people
Kazakhstani male ski jumpers
Olympic ski jumpers of Kazakhstan
Ski jumpers at the 2002 Winter Olympics
Sportspeople from Almaty